John C. "Jack" Hueller (September 29, 1898 – August 29, 1993) was an American football guard for the Racine Legion of the National Football League (NFL) from 1922 to 1924.

Biography
Hueller was born on September 29, 1898, in Milwaukee, Wisconsin, he died there in 1993.

References

1898 births
1993 deaths
Racine Legion players
Players of American football from Milwaukee